Connie LaJoyce Johnson (born July 1, 1969, in Chicago, Illinois) is a Democratic member of the Missouri House of Representatives, representing District 61 since 2001. She is currently Minority Whip.

She received a bachelor's degree from Bradley University, a JD from Saint Louis University School of Law, and a master's degree in Health Administration from Saint Louis University.

External links
Missouri House of Representatives - Connie 'LaJoyce' Johnson  official MO House website
Project Vote Smart - Representative Connie 'LaJoyce' Johnson (MO) profile
Follow the Money - Connie (LaJoyce) Johnson
2006 2004 2002 2000 campaign contributions

Members of the Missouri House of Representatives
1969 births
Living people
Politicians from Chicago
Saint Louis University School of Law alumni
Women state legislators in Missouri
21st-century American women